John Christopher Patrick Anderson (born 7 November 1959) is a former professional footballer who played as a defender. He represented the Republic of Ireland, and played for club sides West Bromwich Albion, Preston North End and Newcastle United.

Club career

Anderson was on the books of West Bromwich Albion between 1976 and 1979. Despite playing in 92 reserve team games for the club, he never made a single first team appearance for the club in a major competition.

Anderson signed for Newcastle United in 1982 on a free transfer from Preston North End. His signing was low key because the club had recently pulled off a major coup in signing England captain Kevin Keegan. A very versatile player,  Anderson made his debut in the 2–1 win at Blackburn Rovers on 1 September 1982.

In 1983–84, Anderson played in one of the most entertaining sides in Newcastle's history as the club scored 85 goals and gained promotion back to the top flight, in a side that featured Keegan, Chris Waddle, Peter Beardsley and Terry McDermott. Anderson played in 41 of the 42 league matches that season. He was given a testimonial by the club in 1992 after 10 years as a Newcastle United player, during which time he made 337 league appearances, scoring 14 goals. One of his goals was a 25-yard free kick in a game at Vicarage Road in the early 1990s against Watford.

International career

Anderson represented the Republic of Ireland at schoolboy, youth and under-21 levels.
Anderson's only international goal was the match winner in the 3–2 victory over the US in a friendly game at Dalymount Park on 29 October 1979. 
This was only his second cap, coming on as a substitute for Pierce O'Leary. It was a much better result than his first cap, also as a substitute but for John Devine.
That game was the 4–1 defeat to Czechoslovakia, played in the Stadion Evžena Rošického on 26 September 1979. 
Anderson's first international start came in the 1–0 defeat to Chile, played in the National Stadium in Santiago on 22 May 1982.
He won 16 caps for the full team and was in the squad for the 1988 European Championship finals, although he was an unused substitute for all of the three Group B matches. He missed out on going to the 1990 FIFA World Cup in Italy. His last game for Ireland was in the testimonial for Peadar O'Driscoll against Tunisia on 19 October 1988, with Ireland winning, 4–0.

After football 

Anderson retired from playing football in 1992. He was always a fans' favourite at St James' Park and he is regularly asked to come to the club for ex-players' events. He also works as an analyst on Republic of Ireland international matches for RTÉ radio and summariser on Newcastle games for BBC Radio Newcastle.

References

External links

Living people
1959 births
Association footballers from Dublin (city)
Republic of Ireland association footballers
Preston North End F.C. players
West Bromwich Albion F.C. players
Newcastle United F.C. players
Association football defenders
UEFA Euro 1988 players
Republic of Ireland international footballers
Republic of Ireland youth international footballers
Republic of Ireland under-21 international footballers
English Football League players
Stella Maris F.C. players